Syllepte paucistrialis is a moth in the family Crambidae. It was described by William Warren in 1896. It is found in India (Meghalaya).

The wingspan is about 20 mm. The forewings are pale straw-colour with a dark grey discal spot and an indistinct curved dark grey line beyond the middle, not reaching the costa and ill-defined towards the inner margin, containing a dark spot on the subcostal and another on the first median nervule, followed by three or four dark grey dashes, indicating a submarginal line. The hindwings have a smaller discal dot and dark grey submarginal line, not reaching either the costa or the inner margin.

References

Moths described in 1896
paucistrialis
Moths of Asia